Daníel Hilmarsson (born 8 February 1964) was an Icelandic alpine skier. He competed in three events at the 1988 Winter Olympics.

References

External links
 

1964 births
Living people
Daníel Hilmarsson
Daníel Hilmarsson
Alpine skiers at the 1988 Winter Olympics
Daníel Hilmarsson
20th-century Icelandic people